Ma On Shan Promenade is an urban waterfront park in Ma On Shan, Hong Kong. The promenade occupies an area of 5.2 hectares and is 3.2 km long. It was constructed at a cost of HK$220 million and was built in three phases, opening on 18 July 2009, 10 January 2010, and 11 June 2010 respectively.

See also
List of urban public parks and gardens in Hong Kong

References

Urban public parks and gardens in Hong Kong
Ma On Shan
New Territories
Sha Tin District